GCOA may refer to:
 (+)-Caryolan-1-ol synthase, an enzyme
 (+)-beta-caryophyllene synthase, an enzyme